TEAC may refer to:

 TEAC Corporation, a Japanese electronics company
 TEAC Oval, a sports stadium in Port Melbourne, Australia
 Tetraethylammonium chloride, a chemical compound
 Trolox equivalent antioxidant capacity, a measure of antioxidant capacity
 Transfer Emergency Action Contact, a procedure created by ICANN to deal with domain-related disputes
 Thorium Energy Alliance Conference